La Torre is a municipality  composed of the following districts, Balbarda, Blacha, Guareña, Oco and Sanchicorto located in the province of Ávila, Castile and León, Spain. According to the 2004 census (INE), the municipality has a population of 357 inhabitants.

References

Municipalities in the Province of Ávila